Stellarton is a town located in the Canadian province of Nova Scotia. It is adjacent and to the south of the larger town of New Glasgow. In pioneer times the area was called Coal Mines Station, and from 1833 until 1889, it was known as Albion Mines. The town was incorporated as Stellarton in 1889 and owes its name to a specific type of torbanite which came to be known as "stellarite" because of the "stars of fire" given off by its sparky flame.

History
In the 1790s, coal quickly became a key focus of the local economy. The Foord coal seam (from which the main street of Stellarton derives its name) runs through most of the town and is part of the greater Stellarton Basin/Pictou Coalfield. As part of an area recognized by geologists for its unique oil shales and thick coal seams, the Foord seam is said to be the thickest in the world with estimate of coal seams being as thick as 48 feet.

In the 1820s, the mines were taken over by the General Mining Association which intensified production with new technology including the first steam engine in Nova Scotia for pumping and in 1839 Samson, the oldest railway locomotive in Canada which carried coal to waiting ships.

Samson is now preserved at the Nova Scotia Museum of Industry in Stellarton.

Demographics 

Major businesses 
The town is still home to coal mining operations, the Stellarton Surface Coal Mine has been operated by Pioneer Coal since 1980.

The Canadian grocery chain Sobeys is based out of Stellarton, and its corporate offices and grocery subsidiaries provides a fair percentage of the town's employment. Sobeys subsidiaries based in Stellarton include Big 8 Beverages, TRA Cash and Carry, Eastern Sign-Print and Regional Distribution Centre.

One business that did not work out was the Clairtone factory, the brainchild of entrepreneurs Peter Munk and David Gilmour, encouraged by local businessman and politician Frank H. Sobey.

Attractions
Stellarton is home to the Nova Scotia Museum of Industry, part of the Nova Scotia Museum system. Stellarton is noted for its painted fire hydrants, each adorned with a costumed representative of a town inhabitant or profession.

Stellarton Memorial Ice Rink 
The Stellarton Memorial Rink is a Rink in Stellarton that was made in 1945 to remember the soldiers that died in World War I and World War II The rink is still standing today but has not been used for several years

Notable people
 James Peter Robertson - recipient of the Victoria Cross
 Leo McKay Jr. - novelist
 Blayre Turnbull - Olympic gold and silver medalist in Women's Hockey

Navigator

See also
 List of municipalities in Nova Scotia

References

External links
 Town of Stellarton

Communities in Pictou County
Towns in Nova Scotia
Mining communities in Nova Scotia